Sviridovsky is a rural locality (a khutor) in Blizhneositinovskoye Rural Settlement, Surovikinsky District, Volgograd Oblast, Russia. The population was 115 as of 2010. There are 3 streets.

Geography 
Sviridovsky is located on the left bank of the Chir River, 28 km southeast of Surovikino (the district's administrative centre) by road. Ostrovskoy is the nearest rural locality.

References 

Rural localities in Surovikinsky District